The Loch Ness Horror is a 1981 independent monster movie directed by Larry Buchanan. The film was written by Buchanan and Lyn Schubert.

Plot
The Loch Ness Monster is feeding on unsuspecting swimmers and eventually goes on a killing spree. There are three subplots: the monster's egg that is ready to hatch, a scientist who wants to capture the beast, and a mysterious sunken Nazi bomber plane which the military is trying to cover up. A Scottish scientist, George Sanderson, finds help from an American sonic expert, Spencer Dean, to team up and hunt for the monster. Along the journey, Spencer falls in love with Kathleen Stuart, who is the daughter of the first person to claim to take a photo of the monster, Jack Stuart. As these events are happening, a rival scientist, Professor Pratt, and his team are searching for the monster as well. Professor Pratt and his team end up finding a sunken World War II German bomber before retrieving the monster's egg. Although Professor Pratt and his team receive the monster's egg, the monster ends up killing his assistants, and Professor Pratt manages to successfully take the egg into his van. As Spencer and Sanderson attempt to locate the monster, Kathleen gets kidnapped by Professor Pratt. Kathleen is held captive while the monster goes on a killing spree in attempts to get her egg back. The monster's efforts are not successful, the monster is blown up, but her eggs are left to survive.

Cast
 Sandy Kenyon as George Sanderson
 Miki MacKenzie as Kathleen Stuart
 Eric Scott as Brad
Barry Buchanan as Spencer Dean
Karey-Louis Scott as Fran
Doc Livingston as Jack Stuart
Stuart Lancaster as Professor Pratt
Preston Hanson as Colonel Laughton
Garth Pillsbury as Sergeant Derek

Production
The film was made on an infamously low budget and on location at Lake Tahoe, California, whose surrounding countryside passes poorly for Scotland. The firearms used were 1 Colt Python and 2 M16s.

Release
It was released on 1 January 1981 under MPAA rating of PG.

Reception
The limited release of this motion picture was poorly received.

The Loch Ness Horror is a 1981 horror movie directed by Larry Buchanan, who had a reputation for helming poorly-made films and even proclaiming himself the "schlockmeister".

The film is infamous for its poor special effects, meandering story, awful use of California doubling for Scotland and the fact that, as with almost all of his films, Larry Buchanan uses members of his family both in front of the camera and behind it, whether they are suited to the task or not. The Nessie puppet (just a head on a stick) was later used as Jack the Ripper in one of the "Bullshit or Not?" segments in Amazon Women on the Moon.

See also
 The Crater Lake Monster
 The Loch Ness Monster

References

External links

 
 The Loch Ness Horror at Letterboxd

1981 horror films
1981 films
American independent films
American monster movies
Loch Ness Monster in film
Films directed by Larry Buchanan
1980s English-language films
1980s American films